Maloško Poldne (1794.2 m) is a peak in the Western Karawanks, on the border between Slovenia and Austria.

References

External links 
 Maloško Poldne on Geopedia

Mountains of Upper Carniola
Karawanks
One-thousanders of Austria
One-thousanders of Slovenia
Mountains of the Alps